VLW6 was a short wave radio service of the Australian Broadcasting Commission in Western Australia between the 1940s and the 1980s.

It was a relay service for services broadcast in Perth, Western Australia.

It was transmitted from Wanneroo.

References 

Radio stations in Western Australia
1948 establishments in Australia
Short wave radio in Australia
Shortwave radio stations